Marc Brierley (born 9 October 1944) is an English singer songwriter who was active as a performing musician between 1965 and 1973.

1965–1970
Between 1966 and 1970 he wrote, performed and recorded one EP - 1966, Marc Brierley; one LP - 1968, Welcome to the Citadel; a second LP – 1969, Hello produced by Ashley Kozak; two singles taken from the two CBS LPs – "Hold On, Hold On" – 1968, and "Lady of the Light" – 1969; and two further singles, "Stay a Little Longer Merry Ann" CBS, 1969 and "Be my Brother" CBS, 1970.

In 1965, on the encouragement of Bert Jansch, Marc became a regular at Les Cousins folk club in Greek Street London, playing alongside regular performers such as John Renbourn, Sandy Denny, Al Stewart and Trevor Lucas.

1971–1973
From 1970 to 1973, Marc Brierley continued song writing and performed live throughout the UK with guitarist Steve Cross, culminating in a UK autumn tour as Fairport Convention's support act.

At the end of 1973, Marc Brierley ceased professional musical activity.

Subsequent years
In the intervening period, Brierley's original vinyl recordings have become collectable.

In 2005, Sanctuary Records Group released a double CD set titled Autograph of Time, comprising digitally remastered versions of all Marc Brierley's recorded output of 1966–1970.

In 2014, Cherry Red Records Group released a compilation on the Cherry Tree label with the title, Welcome to the Citadel, using the same cover artwork as the original CBS LP release, comprising the whole of the Citadel recordings with the addition of the Transatlantic Records EP, and a further five previously unreleased tracks derived from rehearsal demos.

Also in 2014, Cherry Red Records Group released a compilation on the Cherry Tree label with the title, Hello, using the same cover artwork as the original CBS LP release, comprising the whole of the Hello recordings with the addition of eight previously unreleased tracks derived from a demo session recorded by Island Records in 1973.

Since the key recordings have been re-issued, Rob Hatch-Miller wrote in his review, "The anthology gives the listener a good idea of Marc Brierley's brilliant musical evolution, from his early days as a straight-faced Dylanite singer-songwriter, to the whimsical and slightly psychedelic folk pop of his later work ... a long overdue introduction to a unique and remarkable artist whose music is more than worthy of a prime spot in the folk-rock canon". Brierley's work has continued to resonate: "His reputation has never stopped growing, however, and a recent CD retrospective has given him a far wider audience than before."

Marc Brierley gave his first full length live performance since 1973 on 24 January 2018 at the Betsey Trotwood, Clerkenwell, London.

Discography

References

External links
 

1944 births
Living people